is a women's football club based in Setagaya, Tokyo. The club currently play in Nadeshiko League, Japan's second tier of women football league.

Squad

Current squad

Club officials

Results

References

 Sfida Setagaya F.C. top team members

External links 
 Sfida Setagaya F.C. official site
 Japanese Club Teams

Women's football clubs in Japan
2012 establishments in Japan
Football clubs in Tokyo